The Quebec Games is a biennial multi-sport event, held every two years in the Canadian province of Quebec, alternating between the Quebec Winter Games and the Quebec Summer Games. Athletes are strictly amateur only, and represent their region.

The Games were founded in 1970. The first editions of both the Quebec Winter Games and Quebec Summer Games were held in 1971. Since 1981, they have held every odd year. Since 2009, a Quebec Games is held every year, alternating between Winter Games (odd years) and Summer Games (even years).

History
The 2016 edition was held at Montreal's Olympic Stadium in conjunction with the 40th Anniversary Celebrations of the 1976 Montreal Summer Olympics. At around 3700 athletes, the event was larger than the last Winter Olympics in 2014.

Winter sports

A total of 26 sports are a part of the Quebec Winter Games as of 2021 and include the following:

 
  Para-badminton
 
 
 
 
 
 
 
 

 
 
 
 
 
 
  Long track speed skating
 

  Ringette

Summer sports

A total of 28 sports are a part of the Quebec Summer Games as of 2021 and include the following:

Host cities

Regions
For the purpose of the games, Quebec is sub-divided into 19 regions. Each region carries out its own competitions in each sport, from which the best athletes are chosen to compete at the provincial level.

See also

Canada Games
Canada Summer Games
Canada Winter Games
Western Canada Summer Games
BC Games
BC Summer Games
BC Winter Games
Alberta Winter Games
Saskatchewan Games
Manitoba Games
Ontario Games

References

External links
Jeux du Québec 

1971 establishments in Quebec
Multi-sport events in Canada
Recurring sporting events established in 1971
Sports competitions in Quebec